Jardim (Portuguese for "garden") may refer to:

People
 Alberto João Jardim, Portuguese politician and President of the Autonomous Region of Madeira
 José Jardim (born 1973), Curaçaoan politician
 Leonardo Jardim (1974), Portuguese association football coach (Olympiakos, Sporting CP, Monaco)
 Simone Jardim (born 1979), professional pickleball player
 Luís Jardim, percussionist
 Vicky Jardim, Australian television reporter for Nine News

Places

Brazil
 Belo Jardim, a municipality in the State of Pernambuco
 Bom Jardim, Maranhão, a municipality in the State of Maranhão
 Bom Jardim, Pernambuco, a municipality in the State of Pernambuco
 Bom Jardim, Rio de Janeiro, a municipality in the State of Rio de Janeiro
 Bom Jardim de Goiás, a municipality in the State of Goiás
 Bom Jardim de Minas, a municipality in the State of Minas Gerais
 Bom Jardim da Serra, a municipality in the State of Santa Catarina
 Jardim, Ceará, a municipality in the State of Ceará
 Jardim, Mato Grosso do Sul, a municipality in the State of Mato Grosso do Sul
 Jardim, São Paulo, São Paulo, a barrio in the State of São Paulo (state)
 Jardim Alegre, a municipality in the State of Paraná
 Jardim de Angicos, a municipality in the State of Rio Grande do Norte
 Jardim do Mulato, a municipality in the State of Piauí
 Jardim Olinda, a municipality in the State of Paraná
 Jardim de Piranhas, a municipality in the State of Rio Grande do Norte
 Jardim do Seridó, a municipality in the State of Rio Grande do Norte
 Novo Jardim, a municipality in the State of Tocantins
 Santo Antônio do Jardim, a municipality in the State of São Paulo
 Silva Jardim, a municipality in the State of Rio de Janeiro

Portugal
 Jardim do Mar, a civil parish in the municipality of Calheta, Madeira
 Jardim da Serra, a civil parish in the municipality of Câmara de Lobos, Madeira

Portuguese-language surnames